Mads is a male given name, a Scandinavian form of Matthew (see also: Mats). Notable people with the name include:

Music
 Mads Arp, Danish composer, producer and electronic music pioneer
 Mads Christian (born 2000), Danish singer
 Mads Eriksen (born 1962), Norwegian guitarist and composer
 Mads Langer (born 1984), Danish composer, singer-songwriter and pop musician born Langer Clausen
 Mads Tolling (born 1980), Danish-American violinist and composer
 Mads Tunebjerg, Danish bass player in the Danish rock band Kashmir
 Mads Vinding, Danish jazz double-bassist

Sports
 Mads Albæk (born 1990), Danish footballer
 Mads Andersen (rower) (born 1978), Danish rower
 Mads Juel Andersen (born 1997), Danish footballer
 Mads Glæsner (born 1988), Danish swimmer
 Mads Jørgensen (born 1979), Danish retired footballer
 Mads Jørgensen (footballer, born 1998), Danish footballer
 Mads Junker (born 1981), Danish pundit and retired footballer
 Mads Kaggestad (born 1977), Norwegian retired road racing cyclist
 Mads Laudrup (born 1989), Danish professional football player who currently plays for HB Køge
 Mads Østberg (born 1987), Norwegian rally car driver
 Mads Pedersen (badminton) (born 1990), Danish badminton player
 Mads Pedersen (cyclist) (born 1995), Danish road racing cyclist, 2019 Road Race World Champion
 Mads Pedersen (footballer, born 1993), Danish footballer
 Mads Rasmussen (born 1981), Danish rower
 Mads Timm (born 1984), Danish footballer
 Mads Valentin (born 1996), Danish footballer

Other fields
 Mads Alstrup (1808–1876), Danish photographer
 Mads Andersen (chess player) (born 1995), Danish chess grandmaster
 Mads Andersen (poker player) (born 1970), Danish poker and backgammon player
 Mads Brügger (born 1972), Danish filmmaker and TV host
 Mads Clausen (1905–1966), Danish industrialist and founder of Danfoss
 Mads Eriksen (born 1977), Norwegian cartoonist
 Mads Fuglede (born 1971), Danish politician
 Mads Gilbert (born 1947), Norwegian doctor, activist and politician
 Mads Gram (1875–1929), Norwegian physician
 Mads Langaard (1815–1891), Norwegian brewery owner and industrialist
 Mads Johansen Lange (1807–1856), Danish trader, entrepreneur and peace maker on Bali
 Mads Lauritz Madsen (1782–1840), Norwegian politician
 Mads Nissen (born 1979), Danish photojournalist
 Mads Mikkelsen (born 1965), Danish actor
 Mads Sjøgård Pettersen, Norwegian actor
 Mads Rørvig, Danish politician 

Danish masculine given names
Norwegian masculine given names